Modane is a commune in the Savoie department in the Auvergne-Rhône-Alpes region in southeastern France.

The commune is in the Maurienne Valley, and it also belongs to the Vanoise National Park. It was part of the Kingdom of Sardinia until the Treaty of Turin in 1860.

Geography

Location

Crossed by the Arc river, it extends to the doors of the Haute-Maurienne. The issue of the attachment or not of Modane in the Maurienne Valley or Haute-Maurienne differs depending on the disciplines of economics, geography or geology. For economists, Modane is attached to Haute Maurienne, arguing that the city has a very strong influence on the villages of Haute Maurienne, through economic and administrative infrastructure such as shopping centres, schools or the railway station for example. However, for the great majority of analysts, Modane is a commune attached to the middle part of this valley, both by the relief (encompassing the whole canton is a dug coal-bearing furrow which extends to Saint-Michel-de-Maurienne), and by the industrial history of this sector.

With an area of  [], the commune extends along a north–south axis on both sides of the valley. To the north, Modane is bounded by the Roc des Saints Pères, and the Aiguille de Péclet (northwest) and the Dôme de Polset (northeast).

The Modane territory extends in a particular form.

These peaks, however, leave easy passages, particularly frequented during summer by hiking tourists, either to the Tarentaise Valley or to Italy. In addition, some welcome ski resorts located within walking distance of the town, among which are Aussois, La Norma and Valfréjus.

Climate 

According to the Köppen climate classification, Modane features a continental mountain climate (Köppen: Dfb), with long, snowy and very cold winters and warm, somewhat dry summers.

Neighbouring communes
The commune of Modane is bordered by nine other communes in France, besides its southern limit marked by the Franco-Italian border. To the west, Modane mainly borders Saint-André and Fourneaux, but also to the south-west, Freney, Orelle, and Névache in the neighbouring department of Hautes-Alpes. To the north, in the Vanoise National Park, the bordering communes are Saint-Martin-de-Belleville  to the north-west, with Les Allues and Pralognan-la-Vanoise to the north-east. To the east lies Villarodin-Bourget, with Avrieux to the south-east.

Routes and transportation

Roads
The commune is at the French end of the Fréjus Road Tunnel, one of the major transalpine road crossings along with the Mont Blanc Tunnel, linking France and Italy. Out of the tunnel, the A43 autoroute begins and which leads to Chambéry and Lyon, also passes on the heights of the commune (in Charmaix).

In addition, the D 1006 (former Route Nationale 6), an important route coming from Chambéry, also passes through Modane before continuing up to the Col du Mont-Cenis and the Italian border. The road is also the main axis of the commune, which it crosses through the full length of the centre. However, it has several street names including, from west to east: Avenue de la Liberté, Rue de la République, Avenue Jean Jaurès and the Cours Aristide Briand.

Railway
The commune of Modane is home to an international railway station, the Gare de Modane, in which receives trains from Turin in Italy, through the Fréjus Rail Tunnel, and with trains to Chambéry, as well as the TGV on the Milan (Italy) to Paris route. The whole of the French part of the line is owned by the Réseau Ferré de France (RFF), the upstream network is managed by Rete Ferroviaria Italiana, society of FS (Ferrovie dello Stato), the lower part and the station being under the management of the SNCF. There is therefore an electrical disconnection and signaling changes upstream (catenary supports also bear inscriptions in Italian).

The railway line serving Modane is the Maurienne line, or its official name the ligne de Culoz à Modane (frontière) [line of Culoz to Modane (border)]. It marks the territory of the commune of Modane looping 180° between its exit from the station and its entry into the Fréjus tunnel.

Urbanism

Rue de Chavière: A 'survivor' street of the misfortunes of the city where you can still notice some houses with half-engaged spiral staircases.
The Le Paquier quarter: The last historic quarter of the town composed of traditional houses grouped around the parish church.

Toponymy
The modern spelling Modane is not attested before circa. 1700. Previously, there were Amoudane, Amaudane, Amaldanus. The initial vowel has therefore fallen from use (taken for the preposition à [to]). The word could come from a proper name, that of the keeper of a manso, Amaudanes, mentioned in a cartulary of the 12th century.

History
In 1871, following the opening of the Mont-Cenis rail tunnel Modane quickly became a border city. The Italian journey began between Italian immigration and transit trade and the population increased significantly. However, the increasingly strained relations between France and Italy lead to the construction in 1885 of the Fort du Replaton, an interdiction fort to monitor the entrance of the tunnel.

During World War I, a train carrying some 1,000 French troops from the Italian front derails while descending a steep hill in Modane; at least half of the soldiers are killed in France's greatest rail disaster.

During World War II, the city was bombed on 13 or 17 September 1943 by Allied aircraft. The objective of the bombing was the station, an important centre of transit between France and Italy. The bombing caused 60 victims and 100 houses were destroyed. A second bombing took place on the night of 10–11 November 1943, killing five civilians.

In 1969, the city turned to tourism. A chairlift departing from Fourneaux and joining the hamlet of Charmaix on the commune of Modane, at  altitude, was indeed created, like the d'Arrondaz snow stadium, allowing skiing at  altitude.

In 1983, the promoter of Tignes, Pierre Schnebelen, created a new station from d'Arrondaz. A new international ski resort was created: Valfréjus (station attached to the municipality of Modane). Between 1983 and 2008, the station evolved to have 7,000 tourist beds.

Politics and administration

Political trends and outcomes

List of mayors

Twinning
Modane is twinned with:

Bardonecchia, Italy since the 1980s
Ohmden, Germany since 2000

Population and society

Demography
In 2017, the commune had 3,097 inhabitants.

Education
Daycare:

Halte garderie "Les petits poucets"
After-school daycare of the schools of Modane

Schools:

Paul Bert kindergarten school
Jules Ferry Elementary School

Collège: La Vanoise Collège

Economy

Agriculture 

In Modane existed around 1892 a large, fortified drying place for Swiss stone pine cones, which was accessed via a Decauville narrow gauge railway. The cones and seeds were used to produce pine liqueur and food, respectively.

Employment

Business and shops

The French society of the Fréjus Road Tunnel (SFTRF), whose head office is located on the platform of the tunnel in Modane, in addition to the road tunnel manages all of the Maurienne autoroute (connecting Aiton at the platform of the tunnel of Modane).
The Modane Underground Laboratory (LSM), centre of basic research of the IN2P3 (CNRS) and the CEA, located in the middle of the Fréjus Road Tunnel
Headquarters of the Jacquemmoz International Transport company founded in 1955. The company saw its fleet of vehicles very strongly affected by the mudslide at Saint-Antoine in 1987. It had 16 trucks and during the mudslide, it lost thirteen. The company now has five branches: Modane, Saint-Rémy-de-Maurienne, Montmélian (Chambéry), Corbas (Lyon), and Puiseaux (Montargis). The transport capacity is 233 vehicles, recent semi-trailers and trailer trucks, operated as a family business accompanied by 320 employees.
The Albaron national training centre of the Red Cross
SNCF border station of Modane
Wind tunnel of Modane, ONERA, the largest in the world. This wind tunnel where many civil and military aircraft have been tested mainly employs technicians and a few researchers, actually located administratively on the commune of Avrieux (adjacent to Modane). It will be closed "if nothing is done to secure its soil", while a renewed interest for wind tunnel testing is emerging in the world, there are yet imperfect digital models.
From 1885 to 1993, the paper mill of the Groupe Matussière & Forest harnessing the power of the Arc at the entrance of Fourneaux, provides work for many people of Modane. The Grenoble papermakers of the Matussiere family gave their name to the current namesake shopping area.

Tourism
Valfréjus ski station concentrates most of these beds and structures (over 70%). The accommodation of the commune is as follows: 139 furnished; 8 apartment hotels; 5 hotels; an outdoors facility; one holiday village and one gîte or overnight gîte.

Sport
The Tour de France cycling race came to Modane, starting stage 19 there, in 2011. Modane is due to welcome the return of the race during the 2015 Tour de France, for the start of stage 20, the penultimate stage, on 25 July.

Local culture and heritage

Places and monuments

The fountain in front of the town hall (Place de la Mairie) is listed as an historical monument. It dates from 1572.
The leaning house: The leaning house is located on the road of Modane to Valfréjus. Formerly known as la poudrière [the powder magazine], it was used to shelter a stock of powder intended to destroy the tunnel in the event of war. The house was made of dry stone. In 1939, it was overcome by the construction of a concrete blockhouse. In 1944 the Germans dynamited the railway tunnel and the dry stone house collapsed. The blockhouse flew  and on falling, sank into the ground while remaining intact. When one enters one easily loses balance, because it is tilted at two angles. It is the most visited monument of the Savoie (free visit). The leaning house is part of the Association of the Saint-Gobain Fort Museum. It belongs to the army, SNCF and the commune of Modane.
The Fort du Replaton was built to defend the entrance of the railway tunnel at the end of the 19th century. This Séré de Rivières-type fort cannot be visited. The walk departing from Loutraz (30 min) is worthwhile as one can see the illuminations of the fort at night.
The monumental entrance of the Fréjus Rail Tunnel was built during the first breakthrough of the Alps between 1857 and 1871. This former entrance of the Fréjus rail tunnel is situated on the road linking Modane to Valfréjus.
The Saint-Jacques Chapel: A unique baroque building of the town, this small Romanesque chapel, in its construction, has been completely restored. Visits are on request from the association for the restoration of the chapel.
The parish church: A testimony of reconstruction, it is due to the architect and also author of the best-known church of the Plateau d'Assy. Only the bell tower of this building pre-dates World War II, the rest having been destroyed during bombings.
The Fort of Saint-Gobain: A structure of the Maginot Line built in 1933 to protect the national road and railway.
Modane internment camp: 539th group of foreign workers in 1940.

Museums
The Museobar: Through four reconstructions of cafes from different eras ranging from 1880 to 1935, the Museobar traces and brings to life the history of Modane and Fourneaux. Trompe-l'œil, music of pianolas, testimonies and especially images are illustrations of this extraordinary story.
The Rizerie des Alpes, a rice mill, an historical monument and labelled as : It was the function of this "Greek temple" in the middle of the city on the edge of the Arc. To view in passing, this building is included in the supplementary inventory of historical monuments. Now converted into an exhibition centre for the future Lyon-Turin link.
Carré Sciences: An interactive space of  dedicated to scientific culture, with the emanation to the general public of the Modane Underground Laboratory of the CNRS.

Personalities linked to the commune
 (1873-1917), engineer and leader of the aluminium conglomerate Pechiney during the years before World War I
, typographer, and grammairen, born in 1926 in Modane
, playwright, born in Modane in 1972.

Heraldry

See also
Communes of the Savoie department
Fréjus Road Tunnel
Fréjus Rail Tunnel
Turin–Lyon high-speed railway

Bibliography

Notes

References

External links

Official site

Communes of Savoie